Italy competed at the 2014 Summer Youth Olympics, in Nanjing, China from 16 August to 28 August 2014.

Archery

Italy qualified a male and female archer from its performance at the 2013 World Archery Youth Championships.

Individual

Team

Athletics

Italy qualified 18 athletes.

Qualification Legend: Q=Final A (medal); qB=Final B (non-medal); qC=Final C (non-medal); qD=Final D (non-medal); qE=Final E (non-medal)

Boys
Track & road events

Field Events

Girls
Track & road events

Field events

Beach Volleyball

Italy qualified a girls' team from their performance at the 2014 CEV Youth Continental Cup Final.

Boxing

Italy qualified four boxers based on its performance at the 2014 AIBA Youth World Championships

Boys

Girls

Canoeing

Italy qualified one boat based on its performance at the 2013 World Junior Canoe Sprint and Slalom Championships.

Boys

Cycling

Italy qualified a boys' and girls' team based on its ranking issued by the UCI.

Team

Mixed Relay

Diving

Italy qualified two quotas based on its performance at the Nanjing 2014 Diving Qualifying Event.

Equestrian

Italy qualified a rider.

Fencing

Italy qualified five athletes based on its performance at the 2014 FIE Cadet World Championships.

Boys

Girls

Mixed Team

Golf

Italy qualified one team of two athletes based on the 8 June 2014 IGF Combined World Amateur Golf Rankings.

Individual

Team

Gymnastics

Artistic Gymnastics

Italy qualified athlete based on its performance at the 2014 European WAG Championships.

Girls

Judo

Italy qualified two athletes based on its performance at the 2013 Cadet World Judo Championships.

Individual

Team

Modern Pentathlon

Italy qualified one athlete based on its performance at the European YOG Qualifiers and another based on its performance at the 2014 Youth A World Championships.

Rowing

Italy qualified two boats based on its performance at the 2013 World Rowing Junior Championships.

Qualification Legend: FA=Final A (medal); FB=Final B (non-medal); FC=Final C (non-medal); FD=Final D (non-medal); SA/B=Semifinals A/B; SC/D=Semifinals C/D; R=Repechage

Sailing

Italy qualified four boats based on its performance at the Byte CII European Continental Qualifiers and Techno 293 European Continental Qualifiers.

Shooting

Italy was given a wild card to compete.

Individual

Team

Swimming

Italy qualified eight swimmers.

Boys

Girls

Mixed

Table Tennis

Italy qualified one athlete based on its performance at the Road to Nanjing series.

Singles

Team

Qualification Legend: Q=Main Bracket (medal); qB=Consolation Bracket (non-medal)

Taekwondo

Italy qualified two athletes based on its performance at the Taekwondo Qualification Tournament.

Girls

Triathlon

Italy qualified one athlete based on its performance at the 2014 European Youth Olympic Games Qualifier.

Individual

Relay

Weightlifting

Italy qualified 1 quota in the boys' and girls' events based on the team ranking after the 2014 Weightlifting Youth European Championships.

Boys

Girls

References

2014 in Italian sport
Nations at the 2014 Summer Youth Olympics
Italy at the Youth Olympics